Karl August Drews (February 22, 1920 – August 15, 1963) was an American professional baseball right-handed pitcher, whose baseball career spanned 21 seasons (1939–59). He played in Major League Baseball (MLB) from 1946 to 1949 and 1951 to 1954 for the New York Yankees, St. Louis Browns, Philadelphia Phillies, and Cincinnati Redlegs.

A Staten Island, New York native, Drews appeared in two games for the Yankees in the 1947 World Series as a relief pitcher and held the Brooklyn Dodgers to one run and two hits in three innings pitched, although he did allow a base on balls and a hit batsman and threw a wild pitch. During his MLB career, Drews appeared in 218 games played, 107 as a starting pitcher, and gave up 913 hits and 332 bases on balls in 826 innings, with 322 strikeouts. In his finest season, with the 1952 Phillies, he finished third in the National League (NL) in shutouts (five), sixth in complete games (15), and seventh in earned run average (ERA) (2.72). Drews won 14 games (losing 15), while appearing in 33 games, 30 as a starter.

On August 15, 1963, Drews was killed at age 43 by a drunk driver in Florida. His grandson, Matt Drews, is a former Minor League Baseball (MiLB) right-handed pitcher selected by the Yankees in the first round of the June 1993 MLB Draft, who played for seven seasons.

References

External links

Karl Drews at SABR (Baseball BioProject)

1920 births
1963 deaths
Akron Yankees players
Amsterdam Rugmakers players
Baltimore Orioles (IL) players
Baseball players from New York (state)
Binghamton Triplets players
Buffalo Bisons (minor league) players
Butler Yankees players
Cincinnati Redlegs players
Evansville Bees players
Indianapolis Indians players
Kansas City Blues (baseball) players
Major League Baseball pitchers
Miami Marlins (IL) players
Newark Bears (IL) players
New York Yankees players
Nashville Vols players
Norfolk Tars players
Oakland Oaks (baseball) players
People from Staten Island
Philadelphia Phillies players
Road incident deaths in Florida
St. Louis Browns players